Ha-Joon Chang (born 7 October 1963) is a South Korean institutional economist, specialising in development economics. Chang is the author of several widely discussed policy books, most notably Kicking Away the Ladder: Development Strategy in Historical Perspective (2002). In 2013, Prospect magazine ranked Chang as one of the top 20 World Thinkers.

He has served as a consultant to the World Bank, the Asian Development Bank, the European Investment Bank, as well as to Oxfam and various United Nations agencies. He is also a fellow at the Center for Economic and Policy Research in Washington, D.C. In addition, Chang serves on the advisory board of Academics Stand Against Poverty (ASAP).

Biography
After graduating from Seoul National University's Department of Economics, he studied at the University of Cambridge, earning an MPhil and a PhD for his thesis entitled The Political Economy of Industrial Policy – Reflections on the Role of State Intervention in 1991. Chang's contribution to economics started while studying under Robert Rowthorn, a leading British Marxist economist, with whom he worked on the elaboration of the theory of industrial policy, which he described as a middle way between central planning and an unrestrained free market. His work in this area is part of a broader approach to economics known as institutionalist political economy which places economic history and socio-political factors at the centre of the evolution of economic practices.

Writing

Kicking Away the Ladder 
In his book Kicking Away the Ladder (which won the European Association for Evolutionary Political Economy's 2003 Gunnar Myrdal Prize), Chang argued that all major developed countries used interventionist economic policies in order to get rich and then tried to forbid other countries from doing the same. The World Trade Organization, World Bank, and International Monetary Fund come in for strong criticism from Chang for "ladder-kicking" of this type which, he argues, is the fundamental obstacle to poverty alleviation in the developing world. This and other work led to his being awarded the 2005 Wassily Leontief Prize for Advancing the Frontiers of Economic Thought from the Global Development and Environment Institute (previous prize-winners include Amartya Sen, John Kenneth Galbraith, Herman Daly, Alice Amsden and Robert Wade).

The book's methodology was criticized by American Douglas Irwin, Professor of Economics at Dartmouth College and author of a 2011 study of the Smoot–Hawley tariff, writing on the website of the Economic History Association:
Chang only looks at countries that developed during the nineteenth century and a small number of the policies they pursued. He did not examine countries that failed to develop in the nineteenth century and see if they pursued the same heterodox policies only more intensively. This is a poor scientific and historical method. Suppose a doctor studied people with long lives and found that some smoked tobacco, but did not study people with shorter lives to see if smoking was even more prevalent. Any conclusions drawn only from the observed relationship would be quite misleading.

Chang countered Irwin's criticisms by arguing that countries that had failed to develop had generally followed free market policies.  Chang also argued that while state interventionism sometimes produced economic failures, it had a better record than unregulated free market economies which, he maintained, very rarely succeeded in producing economic development. He cited evidence that GDP growth in developing countries had been higher prior to external pressures recommending deregulation and extended his analysis to the failures of free trade to induce growth through privatisation and anti-inflationary policies. Chang's book won plaudits from Nobel Prize–winning economist Joseph Stiglitz for its fresh insight and effective blend of contemporary and historical cases but was criticised by former World Bank economist William Easterly, who said that Chang used selective evidence in his book. Chang responded to Easterly's criticisms, asserting that Easterly misread his argument. Easterly in turn provided a counter-reply.

Stanley Engerman, Professor of Economic History at Rochester University praised Chang's approach:Ha-Joon Chang has examined a large body of historical material to reach some very interesting and important conclusions about institutions and economic development. Not only is the historical picture re-examined, but Chang uses this to argue the need for a changing attitude to the institutions desired in today's developing nations. Both as historical reinterpretation and policy advocacy, Kicking Away the  Ladder deserves a wide audience among economists, historians, and members of the policy establishment.

Bad Samaritans 
Following up on the ideas of Kicking Away the Ladder, Chang published Bad Samaritans: The Myth of Free Trade and the Secret History of Capitalism in December 2008.

23 Things They Don't Tell You About Capitalism 
Chang's next book, 23 Things They Don't Tell You About Capitalism, was released in 2011. It offers a twenty-three point rebuttal to aspects of neo-liberal capitalism. This includes assertions such as "Making rich people richer doesn't make the rest of us richer," "Companies should not be run in the interests of their owners," and "The washing machine has changed the world more than the internet has." This book questions the assumptions behind the dogma of neo-liberal capitalism and offers a vision of how we can shape capitalism to humane ends. This marks a broadening of Chang's focus from his previous books that were mainly critiques of neo-liberal capitalism as it related to developing countries. In this book, Chang begins to discuss the issues of the current neo-liberal system across all countries.

Economics: The User's Guide 
Chang's 2014 book, Economics: The User's Guide, is an introduction to economics, written for the general public.

Publications

Books
 The Political Economy of Industrial Policy (St. Martin's Press; 1994)
 The Transformation of the Communist Economies: Against the Mainstream (Palgrave Macmillan; 1995) 
 Financial Liberalization and the Asian Crisis (Palgrave Macmillan; 2001)  
 Joseph Stiglitz and the World Bank: The Rebel Within (collection of Stiglitz speeches) (Anthem; 2001) 
 Kicking Away the Ladder: Development Strategy in Historical Perspective (Anthem; 2002) 
 Globalization, Economic Development, and the Role of the State (essay collection) (Zed Books; 2002) 
 Restructuring Korea Inc. (with Jang-Sup Shin) (Routledge; 2003) 
 Reclaiming Development: An Alternative Economic Policy Manual (with Ilene Grabel) (Zed; 2004) 
 The Politics of Trade and Industrial Policy in Africa: Forced Consensus (edited with Charles Chukwuma Soludo & Osita Ogbu) (Africa World Press; 2004) 
 Gae-Hyuck Ui Dut (The Reform Trap), Bookie, Seoul, 2004 (collection of essays in Korean)
 Kwe-Do Nan-Ma Hankook-Kyungje  (Cutting the Gordian Knot – An Analysis of the Korean Economy) Bookie, Seoul, 2005 (in Korean) (co-author: Seung-il Jeong) 
 The East Asian Development Experience: The Miracle, the Crisis and the Future (Zed; 2007) 
 Bad Samaritans: The Myth of Free Trade and the Secret History of Capitalism (Bloomsbury; 2008) 
 23 Things They Don't Tell You About Capitalism (Penguin Books Ltd; 2010) 
 Economics: The User's Guide (Pelican Books; 2014) 
 Edible Economics – A Hungry Economist Explains the World (Pelican Books; 2022) ISBN 9780241534649

Papers and articles
 Intellectual Property Rights and Economic Development: Historical lessons and emerging issues, TWN, 2001
 Who Benefits from the New International Intellectual Property Rights Regime?: And what Should Africa Do?, ATPSN, 2001
 Economic History of the Developed World: Lessons for Africa Economic History of the Developed World: Lessons for Africa, 2009.
 Industrial Policy: Can Africa do it? , July 2012.
 Institutional Change and Economic Development, Tokyo 2007.
 Kicking Away the Ladder: The "Real" History of Free Trade, Foreign Policy, 30 December 2003
 "Foreign Investment Regulation in Historical Perspective Lessons for the Proposed WTO Investment Agreement", Global Policy, 2003.

Personal life
He is the son of a former minister of industry and resources, Chang Jae-sik, brother of a historian and philosopher of science, Hasok Chang, and cousin of a prominent economist and professor at Korea University, Chang Ha-Seong.
He lives in Cambridge with his wife, Hee-Jeong Kim, and two children, Yuna, and Jin-Gyu.

See also

 Capitalism
 Criticism of capitalism
 Institutionalist political economy
 Miracle on the Han River

References

External links

 Ha-Joon Chang official website
 Ha-Joon Chang Ha-Joon Chang - SOAS
 Column archive at The Guardian
 
 
 
 
Interviews
 "Why the World Isn't Flat" video of Ha-Joon Chang lecture for the New America Foundation, 4 February 2008
 Korea Society Podcast: Ha-Joon Chang Discusses Bad Samaritans: The Myth of Free Trade and the Secret History of Capitalism, 28 May 2008
 "Economist Ha-Joon Chang on 'The Myth of Free Trade and the Secret History of Capitalism'" Ha-Joon Chang interviewed on Democracy Now!, 10 March 2009 (video, audio, and print transcript)
 Ha-Joon Chang on the G20 Summit, Currency Wars and Why the Free Market is a "Myth" – video interview by Democracy Now!, 12 November 2010
 Ha-Joon Chang on RAI Economy portal
 Lunch with the FT: Ha-Joon Chang

Living people
1963 births
Seoul National University alumni
Alumni of the University of Cambridge
Academics of the University of Cambridge
Academics of SOAS University of London
21st-century South Korean economists
Development economists
Development specialists
South Korean progressives
Indong Jang clan
Center for Economic and Policy Research
20th-century South Korean economists